Mario Corti may refer to:

 Mario Corti (violinist) (1882–1957), Italian violinist
 Mario Corti (skier), Italian Nordic combined skier
 Mario Corti (journalist) (born 1945), Italian journalist and writer
 Mario Corti (cyclist) (born 1946), Italian cyclist
 Mario Corti (manager) (born 1946), Swiss businessman